The siege of Smolensk, in Polish (oblężenie Smoleńska) and known as the Smolensk Defense in Russia (Смоленская оборона in Russian), lasted 20 months between 29 September 1609 to 13 June 1611, when the Polish army besieged the Russian city of Smolensk during the Polish–Muscovite War (1605–1618).

The siege

Polish assaults
In September 1609, the Polish army under the command of King Sigismund III Vasa (22,500 men: 4,000 infantry soldiers and 8,500 cavalry with 4,342 being the Winged Hussars and later to be joined by 10,000 Ukrainian Cossacks) approached Smolensk. The city was defended by the Russian garrison under the command of voyevoda Mikhail Borisovich Shein (over 5,400 men with 170 guns, 500 Swedes, and 14,600 inhabitants who volunteered). On 25–27 September, the invaders assaulted Smolensk for the first time with no result. Between 28 September and 4 October, the Poles were shelling the city and then decided to lay siege to it. On 19–20 July, 11 August, and 21 September, the Polish army attacked Smolensk for the second, third, and fourth time, but to no avail. The siege, the shelling, and the assaults alternated with fruitless attempts of the Polish army to persuade the citizens of Smolensk to capitulate. Negotiations in September 1610 and March 1611 did not lead anywhere.

The largest mining project at Smolensk came in December 1610; however, the Poles only managed to destroy a large portion of the outer wall, the inner walls remaining intact. The siege continued. At one point, the Polish guns breached the outer wall and the voivode of Bracław ordered his soldiers to rush in; however, the Russians could see where the breach would come and had fortified that part of the wall with more people. Both sides were slaughtered, and the Poles were eventually beaten back.

Russian demise
The citizens of Smolensk had been coping with starvation and epidemic since the summer of 1610. The weakened Russian garrison (with only about 200 remaining soldiers) was not able to repel the fifth attack of the Polish army on 3 June 1611, when after the 20 months of siege the Polish army advised by the runaway traitor Andrei Dedishin, discovered a weakness in the fortress defence and on 13 June 1611 a Cavalier of Malta, inserted a mine into a sewer canal and the succeeding explosion created a large breach in the fortress walls.  was the first on the walls. The fortress fell on the same day, with the last stage taking place after violent street fighting when some 3,000 Russians citizens blew themselves up in the Assumption Cathedral. The wounded Mikhail Shein was taken prisoner and would remain a prisoner of Poland for the next 9 years.

Gallery

Aftermath
Although it was a blow to lose Smolensk, it freed up Russian troops to fight the Commonwealth in Moscow, whereas Shein came to be considered a hero for holding out as long as he had. Smolensk would later become the place of a siege in 1612 and again in 1617.

See also
 Time of Troubles

References 

Battles of the Polish–Muscovite War (1605–1618)
Conflicts in 1609
Conflicts in 1610
Conflicts in 1611
Sieges involving Poland
Sieges involving Russia
Sieges involving the Grand Duchy of Lithuania
History of Smolensk Oblast
Smolensk
1609 in Russia
1610 in Russia
1611 in Russia